is a party game for the Nintendo 64 with elements of dating and social simulation. The title actively enforces a multiplayer approach to gameplay, something unusual for the genre at the time. It was released only in Japan in 1998.

Reception

Reception to the game has been mildly positive. Japanese publication Weekly Famitsu reviewed the game in 1998 giving it a score of 26 out of 40 points. In 2020, website Infinity Retro gave the game a score of 6.3 out of 10, mentioning that the game is "mildly enjoyable" and that "it has enough of its own features to make it unique from the Mario Party line".

Notes

References

Japan-exclusive video games
Nintendo 64 games
Nintendo 64-only games
1998 video games
Video games developed in Japan
Hudson Soft games
Multiplayer and single-player video games